The International Securities Lending Association (ISLA) is an industry association representing the common interests of securities lending and financing market participants across Europe, Middle East and Africa. Its geographically diverse membership of over 160 firms includes institutional investors, asset managers, custodial banks, prime brokers and service providers.

Working closely with the global industry as well as regulators and policy makers, ISLA advocates the importance of securities lending to the broader financial services industry. ISLA supports the development of a safe and efficient framework for the industry, by playing a pivotal role in promoting market best practices and processes, amongst other things. ISLA sponsors the Global Market Securities Lending Agreement (GMSLA) and the annual enforceability review in over 65 jurisdictions globally.

Securities lending 
Securities Lending is a well-established market where an investor temporarily lends securities to a borrower in return for a fee. Securities can either be bonds (issued by Governments or Corporates) or shares in public companies. In addition to the fee, the borrower provides the lender with collateral in the form of other securities or cash, which protects the lender against risk of potential loss in the event that the borrower is unable to return the lender's securities. The value of the collateral is normally greater than the value of the borrowed securities providing additional protection for the lender. To protect both parties against market fluctuations during the life of the transaction, securities on loan and collateral are revalued daily, this is referred to as mark to market.

At the end of the transaction the lender and the borrower return their respective securities/collateral to one another

Securities Lending is key to efficient and robust capital markets as well as providing investors with a low risk way of generating incremental income.

Lenders are commonly investors, including pension funds, insurance companies and sovereign wealth funds. As they typically invest against a long-term horizon, they do not require access to the securities on a daily basis. Therefore, by lending them they can receive additional income in the form of a fee from the borrower without losing the benefits attached to those securities such as dividends or interest payments. The additional revenue generated can help reduce costs for investors, including pensioners.

Borrowers are typically banks that need to borrow securities for three main reasons;

 To guarantee efficient and liquid markets (market making)
 To meet regulatory obligations by holding adequate High Quality Liquid Assets, such as government bonds.
 To support the needs of their clients by ensuring timely settlement of market trades

Securities Lending allows markets to function better by providing better price transparency for investors.

Securities Lending makes markets safer by reducing operational risk through settlement fails.

Market size 
Until the start of 2009, securities lending was only an over-the-counter market, so the size of this industry was difficult to estimate accurately. According to the industry group ISLA, in the year 2007 the balance of securities on loan globally exceeded £1 trillion. In July 2015, the value was $1.72 trillion (with a total of $13.22 trillion available on loan) – similar to levels before the 2008 financial crisis.

The size of the global securities lending market, which includes equity and fixed income securities was recorded as Euro 2.4 Trillion at the end of December 2020.

Sources

External links
International Securities Lending Association (ISLA) Website
An Introduction to The International Securities Lending Association (ISLA)

International trade associations
Securities (finance)
Derivatives (finance)

pl:Pożyczka papierów wartościowych